Andouillé is a commune in the Mayenne department in northwestern France.

Geography
Andouillé is located 15 kilometers from Laval, capital of the department of Mayenne, to which it is connected by the RD 131 and RD 115, and by the river, Mayenne. Bordered on the east by the Mayenne, it is crossed by the Ernée. The winding valley of the river is dominated by the hills of Saudraie and Lattan Crennes.

Population

International relations
Andouillé is twinned with the Nottinghamshire village of Farnsfield in England.

See also
Communes of Mayenne

References

Communes of Mayenne